The Mobile Life Centre at Stockholm University in Kista, Sweden, conducts research in mobile services and ubiquitous computing. The Centre focuses on researching consumer-oriented mobile and ubiquitous services, spanning all areas from entertainment and socialization to work and society. The Centre joins forces with local research organizations such as SICS and The Interactive Institute. It has major partners from the IT and telecom industries, including Ericsson Research, TeliaSonera, Sony Ericsson, and Microsoft Research. Partnerships in the public sector include Stockholm Municipality and Kista Science City, which secure societal relevance, and collaboration with Stockholm Innovation and Growth ensures that results are integrated in the innovation system. The Mobile Life Centre is one of the 19 VINN Excellence Centers selected by Vinnova (the Swedish Government Agency for Innovation Systems).

Funding
The Centre is funded by Vinnova on a 10-year grant, 2007 - 2017.

See also
List of ubiquitous computing research centers
Mobile Interaction

References

External links 
 

Stockholm University
Human–computer interaction
Ubiquitous computing
Research institutes in Sweden